The Women's points race at the 2012 UCI Track Cycling World Championships was held on April 5. Eighteen athletes participated in the contest.

Medalists

Results
The final was held at 22:05.

References

2012 UCI Track Cycling World Championships
UCI Track Cycling World Championships – Women's points race